The Getrag F28/6 manual transmission was built by Getrag and fitted to the C20LET 2.0L Turbo Opel Calibra.

Features
The F28/6 in the Calibra was designed to follow a transverse oriented C20LET engine feeding the front wheels with an outlet to facilitate a driveshaft to feed the rear wheels as well.  If the four-wheel drive system is disengaged, the gearbox will feed only the front wheels.  Conversion kits are readily available from aftermarket suppliers to convert the 6 speed transmission to suit a front-wheel drive vehicle, and this is not an uncommon upgrade (from the 5 speed F20 transmission) amongst owners of the C20XE and X20XEV Calibras.

Configuration
It was a 6 speed transmission with the following configuration:

Clutch diameter: 9.0 inches
1st gear ratio: 3.57:1
2nd gear ratio: 2.16:1
3rd gear ratio: 1.45:1
4th gear ratio: 1.10:1
5th gear ratio: 0.89:1
6th gear ratio: 0.74:1
Reverse gear ratio: 3.23:1
Final drive ratio: 3.72:1 (front), 3.70:1 (rear)

Designation
There have been many references to the numbering designation that Opel elected to utilise for gearboxes, one of the more common arguments is that it refers to the ft·lbf torque capacity of the gearbox, in this case being a  torque limit.  Other arguments include that it is simply related to the engine size (the F28 gearbox was fitted to a 2.0L turbo engine, with the 1.4 multiplier applied for turbocharged vehicles).

The GM transmissions are usually numerically designated in Newton Metres.

The nomenclature of the Opel transmissions is as follows:

The letter F stands for "F"ront-wheel-drive.
Although the F28 is only used in 4WD applications, the base transmission still remains a common FWD gearbox.
The number 28 stands for the maximum torque capacity in Nm/10.
28 means that, the transmission is capable of transferring  nominal torque to the input shaft.

References

General Motors transmissions
F28/6